, also known by the nickname Yoshi-P, is a Japanese video game producer, director and designer working for Square Enix. He is best known for his work on massively multiplayer online role-playing games (MMORPGs), mainly as director and producer of Final Fantasy XIV: A Realm Reborn and its expansions.

Yoshida is credited with the revival of the original Final Fantasy XIV project by commentators like Game Informer, which was initially criticized for poor quality. Yoshida became an Executive Officer at Square Enix in 2015, the Head of Square Enix's Creative Business Unit III and part of the Final Fantasy Committee that is tasked with keeping the franchise's releases and content consistent in 2014.

Biography

Early life and career
Yoshida decided to work on video games in elementary school. His career choice was influenced by two Nintendo Entertainment System games: Mario Bros. shocked him with the idea that people could control what was shown on television and the possibilities of multiplayer design; Dragon Quest III made him want to become a writer due to how engrossed he became by its story, more so than those of books and films. His formative years were lived in Hakodate, where he balanced high school studies with a part-time job running the entire game corner of a toy store.

The Yoshida family had little money; Naoki had to work for play, which led him towards beating as many games as he could and getting the most out of coins spent on arcades. He has been deeply involved in games since childhood, where he would spend hundreds of hours playing just one title. Tactics Ogre, directed by Yasumi Matsuno, is one of his favorites. It made such an impact that he built his career in order to have the opportunity to work with Matsuno and create a game together.

Yoshida joined the video game industry in 1993. He studied at a school run by Hudson Soft, where teaching came from many senior developers, concurrently with an internship at the studio. He applied to Chunsoft, his preferred choice, but the internship meant he could start earlier at Hudson: since Yoshida was going through difficulties at the time, he opted for the latter to give his mother peace of mind faster. He loved the company's games as a child, and wanted to do something for it to find back that energy, as its power faded. He was assigned to the creation of PC Engine games at first. His desire to be a scenario writer got him placed to work in the Far East of Eden series. His role kept expanding, eventually working under Oji Hiroi's supervision on the original , which was ultimately moved to the PC-FX. Yoshida was happy through the production with his position writing all the villager dialogue, but the game was cancelled when he was almost done.

An avid fighting game fan, Yoshida indirectly influenced the balance of Street Fighter EX. A business trip to the AOU Show had a pre-release build of that game available to play. He got sixty consecutive victories there, the last three against members of the Arika team developing it. On the released version, the character Yoshida attained all those wins with, Zangief, was drastically weaker than before.

Later, he participated as a designer in the Bomberman series. He faced a harsh environment: programmers held control over productions, saw designers as useless, would not realize documents if they found them boring and had no patience for people that did not understand or tried to broach their field. Yoshida had to develop his persuasion skills to handle that dynamic; communication in his case was easier than with other designers because he studied coding beforehand. To make the games he wanted to, Yoshida built trust with management and among his colleagues by taking on undesirable projects.

His first experiences playing online games such as  Diablo and the Ultima Online beta test, left a huge impression and turned him into an avid fan. Yoshida submitted three proposals to Hudson's internal new project contests: a multiplayer first-person shooter, a PlayStation 2 multiplayer Dungeon Explorer revival and a PC space exploration MMORPG. After four and a half years at the company, he left Hudson due to creative differences. Yoshida saw all titles he worked on as fun for all ages, but his superior only thought of them as made for children: "I couldn't work in a company that'd allow a person like this to be a manager. As soon as he told me that, I answered that I quit".

After he left Hudson Soft, he worked at several smaller game studios for five years, one of them founded by a former Hudson executive who actively recruited him. After the merger, higher ups ordered a pivot to make it cross-platform with the PlayStation 2 and PlayOnline-compatible. The heads of Square's business divisions had high hopes for his game; those involved in Final Fantasy XI offering support, advice and that game's garbage collection source code. A sales meeting by management concluded a story mode was required, but since the team already had to rework it twice due to their demands, a debate ensued over how to inform the developers, which ultimately led them to shelf it instead.

While working on that game, Yoshida also proposed a tool to run different variations of events in online games by combining preset settings, to aid Toshio Murouchi, a then new member of the PlayOnline operations team.

Career at Square Enix
Following that game's shelving, Saito invited Yoshida to "take his revenge" by moving to Tokyo and working on what was then called Dragon Quest Online. The former Hudson executive encouraged him to take the offer, if he promised to climb the corporate ladder and bring work to that studio. Frustrated at how MMORPGs had not become popular in Japan, Yoshida felt that if Dragon Quest could not do it, nothing else would, which drove him to join the project.

His work on the franchise at the time extended to arcades, as he concurrently helmed the Dragon Quest: Monster Battle Road series. Similarly, Fujisawa was involved in Dragon Quest IX, whose team struggled to decide the project's focus. Eventually, that game required his full attention to be completed, so circa late 2007, he appointed Yoshida as acting director for Dragon Quest X—an arrangement that lasted over a year and a half—due to his "indisputable competence" and trustworthiness. Yoshida's involvement lasted from its early stages up to the internal alpha test; under his tenure, the core systems were completed, a number of systems went from existing only in the document to implemented in working order, and time-consuming parts like character and map graphics were made. The idea to loan player characters as NPC party members came as a result of preserving series integrity: "When working in all Dragon Quest projects, the theme is not about complexity but having a game that's really easy to get into". Yoshida wanted to work on Dragon Quest X until it went gold, but Square Enix company policy was against multiple directors working on the same project; once Fujisawa could return as full-time director on the game, Yoshida's superiors removed him from the team while he was away on a business trip.

Ordered to create something new, Yoshida worked on two projects. As one of Square Enix's "stray dogs" he,  and Hiroshi Minagawa had been sent to various influential western studios in 2009 to study HD game development techniques. Upper management felt a need to compete with western games commercially outside Japan, and asked them to make a project the same way as westerners. They spent a year working on this game, whose visual and game design settled on something extremely similar to Bloodborne with asymmetric multiplayer. Yoshida steered the project as a learning experience for the younger team members, as he wanted to train future directions. That led to an extremely slow development process, and subsequently multiple arguments between Takai and Yoshida. Elsewhere, a desire to make a card game that parents and children could play together led Yoshida to conceive the car-centric Chōsoku Henkei Gyrozetter for arcades.

At the same time, Final Fantasy XIV was facing difficulties right before and right after launch. The "stray dog" trio was pulled into a task force to diagnose that game's issues. They held frequent nightly meetings with members of that team, with Yoshida articulating approaches from both a director and player perspective. It was concluded early on that a solution to all the problems would only be possible as a group effort. After further meetings with the president and vice president of Square Enix included, it was decided in December 2010 to place Yoshida in charge of the staff as both director and—for the first time in his career—producer. Then company president Yoichi Wada attributed this decision to Yoshida's experience, "charismatic" leadership skills and "passionate" will to satisfy customers. The HD game oriented towards western tastes was abandoned, while the Chōsoku Henkei Gyrozetter team—which was still working on pre-production at the time—carried on without Yoshida.

Yoshida was not acquainted with any of the Final Fantasy XIV team's members and thus had to demonstrate his dedication to the project first to gain their trust as director. He then talked with the individual developers to find out their ideas for improvements to the revised version known as Final Fantasy XIV: A Realm Reborn. He proceeded with describing to the team the precise goals to achieve. Yoshida drew some inspiration from his long-lasting enthusiasm for MMORPGs, having played such titles as Ultima Online, EverQuest, Dark Age of Camelot, World of Warcraft, Warhammer Online, Rift, Star Wars: The Old Republic and Guild Wars 2. Game Informer and other commentators have credited Yoshida's direction with "rescuing" the "Final Fantasy XIV" project. He went on to work with Matsuno in creating the Return to Ivalice raid for Final Fantasy XIV: Stormblood, saying he "was able to fulfill [his] dream to work with Matsuno-san".

Between December 2013 and December 2019, Yoshida wrote a regular column for Famitsu titled , discussing his thoughts on Final Fantasy XIV, video games, the game industry, and game development in general. It has been collected into three published volumes. Yoshida ended the column in December 2019 due to lack of time to write it. In September 2020, Final Fantasy XVI was revealed to be in development for PlayStation 5 with Yoshida serving as producer.

Works

Books

References 
Citations

Multi-webpage conversations
 
 
 

Final Fantasy designers
Japanese video game designers
Japanese video game producers
Living people
Square Enix people
1973 births